Lincoln T. Hudson (March 12, 1916  – September 26, 1988) was a U.S. Army Air Force officer, World War II fighter pilot, Prisoner of War in Nazi Germany, and a corporate executive.  During World War II, Hudson served in the all-African-American 332nd Fighter Group's 301st Fighter Squadron, best known as the all-African American combat fighter pilot group, the Tuskegee Airmen, "Red Tails," or among enemy German pilots, “Schwartze Vogelmenschen” ("Black Birdmen").

Hudson served as Senior Vice President of Advertising at Johnson Publishing Company, publishers of the historic African American circulars, Ebony Magazine and Jet Magazine founded by businessman John H. Johnson.

Early life 
Hudson was born on March 12, 1916, in Okmulgee, Oklahoma. He was the son of a Methodist minister who traveled to various congregations in the Southern United States. Hudson graduated from high school in Louisiana.

After moving to Chicago in 1933, Hudson sold hair care products door-to-door for the C.W. Smith Company, an African-American-owned Chicago wholesaler. Hudson also sold insurance and worked in a butcher shop.

Married to Chestine Hudson, Hudson had three children: son Lincoln Jr. son Chester, and daughter, Crystal. Until his death in 1988, Hudson was a longtime resident of Chicago's Chatham neighborhood.

Military service

On June 27, 1944, Hudson graduated from Tuskegee pilot cadet training program's Class 44-F-SE, receiving his wings and commission as a 2nd Lieutenant. During official leave, Hudson and fellow Tuskegee Airmen Harold Brown (Tuskegee Airman) would borrow military planes on the weekend, flying them to Chicago to visit Hudson's wife and to enjoy the city of Chicago.

Assigned to the 332nd Fighter Group's 301st Fighter Squadron, Hudson flew 20 missions during World War II.

Prisoner of War in Nazi Germany 
On the afternoon of March 23, 1945, Hudson's P-51 Mustang experienced engine failure after losing oil. Bailing from his damaged aircraft, Hudson parachuted over eastern Czechoslovakia. After capturing Hudson northeast of Vienna, Austria, at coordinates, 4842N, 1655E, the German military transported Hudson to a prisoner of war (POW) camp at Nuremberg-Langwasser (south of Nuremberg, Germany). The Germans interrogated, severely tortured and beat Hudson, almost beyond recognition. Fellow Tuskegee Airman Harold Brown, captured and sent to Nuremberg-Langwasser a week earlier, recalled barely recognizing Hudson. The Germans later transferred Hudson to the multinational Stalag VII-A (in full: Kriegsgefangenen-Mannschafts-Stammlager VII-A), the largest prisoner-of-war camp in Nazi Germany.

On April 29, 1945, General George Patton and his Third Army liberated Hudson, Harold Brown and approximately 76,000 other POWs as Patton's tanks and troops rolled through Stalag VII-A.

Awards and honors
 Congressional Gold Medal Awarded to Tuskegee Airmen in 2006

Post-World War II, Ebony and Jet Magazines 
In 1946, Hudson received an honorable discharge from the U.S. Army Air Corps. In 1951, he enrolled at Loyola University Chicago, graduating with a degree in business. After some graduate work at the University of Chicago in November 1952, Hudson became an advertising salesman with Johnson Publishing, the publishers of the historic Ebony Magazine and Jet Magazine. Hudson rose up the ranks at Johnson Publishing as Midwest advertising manager, Vice President of Advertising, and finally Senior Vice President. In the late 1950s, Hudson closed a lucrative advertising contract between Johnson Publishing and Chevrolet, one of the first U.S. automobile companies to advertise in an African American publication.

Death 
Hudson died on September 26, 1988, in Chicago, Illinois. He was interred at Lincoln Cemetery in Blue Island, Illinois, in Cook County.

See also 
 Executive Order 9981
List of Tuskegee Airmen Cadet Pilot Graduation Classes
List of Tuskegee Airmen
Military history of African Americans
 The Tuskegee Airmen (movie)

References

Notes

1916 births
1988 deaths
Tuskegee Airmen
United States Army Air Forces officers
Military personnel from Tuskegee, Alabama
African-American aviators
Military personnel from Chicago